Joh. C. Tecklenborg was a German shipbuilding company, located at the river Geeste in Bremerhaven. About 440 ships of different types, including many famous tall sailing ships were built at the yard. Founded in 1841 it was finally closed in 1928.

History 

The beginning dates back to September 30, 1841 when Johann (Jan) Simon Abegg and P.H. Ulrichs started the small shipyard  "Abegg & Co"  in Bremerhaven near the mouth of the river Geeste. This venture was financed by the entrepreneur and shipowner Franz Tecklenborg (1807-1886) from Bremen. In 1843 Franz Tecklenborg took over all activities but handed the operational responsibility to his brother the shipbuilder Johann Carl Tecklenborg (1820-1873). From this point on the shipyard operated under the name  "Johann C.Tecklenborg". When Franz Tecklenborg decided to extend the fleet of his shipping company based in Bremen he ordered 19 vessels at the yard of his brother in the following years.

To cope with rising demand of ships the shipyard opened a new site across the river Geeste in Geestemüde in 1852. In 1872 Franz Tecklenborgs youngest son Eduard Tecklenborg (1849-1926) entered into the company and took on responsibility. After the death of Johann Carl Tecklenborg in 1873 the technical management was handed over to the talented engineer Georg Wilhelm Claussen (1845-1919).

As of 1880 iron and then steel replaced wood as the core material for the hull of all ships build by Joh. C.Tecklenborg. The shipyard build several of the so-called Flying P-Liners. In 1897 the company was converted into a stock cooperation and operated as Joh. C. Tecklenborg Schiffswerft- und Maschinenfabrik AG. In 1914 over 4300 people were employed by the shipyard.

In 1926 Tecklenborg became member of the Deschimag - a cooperation of several more or less important German shipyards under the leadership of Bremen's shipyard AG Weser. But already two years later in 1928 the Tecklenborg shipyard was finally closed. Reasons were the low market trend of new construction of merchant ships because of the upcoming economic crisis and the following global depression in the 1930th, the internal local competition between the both great shipyards in Bremerhaven Tecklenborg and G. Seebeck, but last not least the competition to the leading company AG Weser. About 2,500 people lost their jobs in Bremerhaven at that time.

The last ship delivered by Tecklenborg was the Schulschiff Deutschland in 1927.

Ships built by Joh. C. Tecklenborg (selection) 

• 1846, Rappahannock, first ship of the yard, type of the ship is unknown

She was surrendered to the United Kingdom at the conclusion of the First World War, and was scrapped in Japan.

• 1914, Pungo, motor ship, later named Möwe, in WW I used as auxiliary cruiser and mine-layer, sunk by Royal Air force in Norway in WW II (named Oldenburg)

• 1927, Schulschiff Deutschland, last ship of the yard, full-rigged three-mast sailing ship without auxiliary-engine, today museum-ship in Bremen-Vegesack ("White Swan of the LOWER-WESER")

Tall ships 
 Placilla (built 1892)
 Pisagua (built 1893)
 Potosi (steel barque, built 1895)
 Preußen (built 1902)
 Statsraad Lehmkuhl (built 1914)

Ocean liner 
 SS Frankfurt (built 1899)
 SS Scharnhorst (built 1904) 
 SS Prinz Friedrich Wilhelm (built 1908)

Freight ships 
 Hessen (built 1905) - later named HMAT A45 Bulla
 Ockenfels (built 1910) - later named USS Pequot (ID-2998)
 Freienfels (built 1910) - later named SS Empire Defender
 Solfels (built 1913) - later named SS Empire Advocate
 Pungo (built 1914) - later named SMS Möwe
 Vogtland (1919) - later named SS Cambridge

Military ships 
 German minesweeper M 107 (built 1918)

Ships still afloat 
 Großherzog Friedrich August (barque, built 1914); today's name Statsraad Lehmkuhl
 Padua (built 1926); today's name Kruzenstern
 Schulschiff Deutschland (built 1927); serves as Museumsship in Bremen-Vegesack
 Schulschiff Großherzogin Elisabeth (built 1901); named Duchesse Anne in Dunkirk
 Seefalke (Tugboat, built 1924); serves as Museumsship in Bremerhaven

References 
 Herbert Schwarzwälder: Das Große Bremen-Lexikon,   2002, 
 Peter Michael Pawlik, Von der Weser in die Welt, Band III, Verlag H.M. Hauschild GmbH Bremen,

External links 
 Die Tecklenborg-Werft - Website of Historisches Museum, Bremerhaven
 Commons: Ships built at Joh. C. Tecklenborg

Shipbuilding companies of Germany
1841 establishments in Germany
Manufacturing companies disestablished in 1928